Flores Island may refer to:
Flores, an island in Indonesia
Flores Island (Azores), an island of the Azores archipelago
Flores Island (British Columbia), laying off the west coast of Vancouver Island in British Columbia, Canada
Isla de Flores in Uruguay